Yolüstü (literally "along the way" in Turkic) may refer to the following places:

Azerbaijan
 Yolüstü, Salyan, a village and municipality in Salyan Rayon

Turkey
 Yolüstü, Ardanuç, a village in the district of Ardanuç, Artvin Province
 Yolüstü, Edirne
 Yolüstü, Elâzığ
 Yolüstü, Hasankeyf, a village in the district of Hasankeyf, Batman Province
 Yolüstü, Hınıs
 Yolüstü, İnebolu, a village
 Yolüstü, Karacasu, a village in the district of Karacasu, Aydın Province
 Yolüstü, Merzifon, a village in the district of Merzifon, Amasya Province
 Yolüstü, Sason, a village in the district of Sason, Batman Province